Maninder Singh (Australian chef) 

 Maninder Singh (actor), Indian television actor
 Maninder Singh (cricketer), Indian cricket player
 Maninder Singh (footballer), Indian football player
 Maninder Singh Dhir, Indian politician
 Maninder Singh (kabaddi), Indian Kabbadi player
 Manjinder Singh (general), lieutenant general in the Indian Army